The North Staffordshire Railway (NSR) H1 Class was a class of 0-6-0 steam locomotive designed by John H. Adams, third son of William Adams. They were designed as a development as the previous H Class, adding a Belpaire firebox to a new design of boiler, which was similar to that of the NSR G class but with a reduced barrel length. Four were built between December 1910 and March 1911, all at the company's Stoke railway works. The whole class was withdrawn by the end of 1930, having quickly been displaced by the LMS 4F.

As with the H class, the H1s were built with the NSR's long distance freight work outside of their own system thanks to their extensive running powers, but they also partook in some passenger and excursion trains.

The livery of the H1 Class was the NSR's Madder Lake with straw lining, and NORTH STAFFORD lettering on the tender along with the company crest. The number appeared on the cabside. In LMS days  they received the standard plain black freight livery with large numerals on the tender. They were renumbered twice in LMS ownership; once, upon grouping, in the 23xx series, and again in 1928 to make way for the LMS Fowler 2-6-4T being built at the time. As a result, they were put in the 83xx series following on from the LNWR 18in Goods Class.

List of Locomotives

References

North Staffordshire Railway
0-6-0 locomotives
Railway locomotives introduced in 1910
Standard gauge steam locomotives of Great Britain
Scrapped locomotives